Francis Speed may refer to:

 Francis Speed (Barbadian cricketer) (1849–1906), Barbadian cricketer
 Francis Speed (English cricketer) (1859–1928), English cricketer